David John Rivers Sleath  is the chief executive of SEGRO plc (formerly known as Slough Estates).

He was appointed Officer of the Order of the British Empire (OBE) in the 2022 New Year Honours for services to charity and business.

References

British chief executives
Living people
Year of birth missing (living people)
Officers of the Order of the British Empire